Yoric Ravet (born 12 September 1989) is a French professional footballer who plays as a winger for French amateur club ES Manival.

Club career
Since childhood, Ravet was with Grenoble Foot 38, growing up in nearby Échirolles. He primarily played in the reserves before being promoted to the senior squad for the 2008–09 season. He was given the number 33 shirt and proceeded to make his professional football debut on the opening match day of the season against FC Sochaux-Montbéliard, coming on as a substitute in the 82nd minute. Despite playing only 8 minutes in the match, he still managed to pick up a yellow card. He went on to make two more league appearances, as well an appearance in the Coupe de la Ligue.

On 15 June 2012, Ravet joined Ligue 2 side Angers on a season-long loan deal.

On 29 July 2013, Ravet signed a two-year deal with the Swiss side Lausanne-Sport.

On 29 August 2017, Ravet joined Bundesliga side SC Freiburg. The transfer fee paid to Young Boys was reported as €4.5 million.

In February 2019, he joined Grasshopper Zürich on loan until the end of the season.

International career
On 25 May 2009, Ravet was selected to the under-20 squad to participate in the 2009 Mediterranean Games.

Career statistics

References

External links
 
 Yoric Ravet Interview

Living people
1989 births
People from Échirolles
Sportspeople from Isère
Association football forwards
French footballers
France youth international footballers
Grenoble Foot 38 players
AS Saint-Étienne players
Angers SCO players
FC Lausanne-Sport players
Grasshopper Club Zürich players
BSC Young Boys players
SC Freiburg players
Ligue 1 players
Ligue 2 players
Championnat National 2 players
Championnat National 3 players
Swiss Super League players
Bundesliga players
French expatriate footballers
Expatriate footballers in Switzerland
Expatriate footballers in Germany
Footballers from Auvergne-Rhône-Alpes